Khuvkhoitun sometimes referred to as Gora Khuvkhoitun is a stratovolcano located on Russia's Kamchatka Peninsula. The mountain reaches 2,616 m in elevation above sea level.

See also
 List of ultras of Northeast Asia
 List of volcanoes in Russia

Notes

References 
 
 

Mountains of the Kamchatka Peninsula
Volcanoes of the Kamchatka Peninsula
Stratovolcanoes of Russia
Pleistocene stratovolcanoes